Grigoriy Arkadyevich Tarasevich (born 1 August 1995) is a Russian swimmer. In 2013 he won the world junior title in the 50 m backstroke, setting a junior world record. He competed in the 50 m, 100 m and 200 m backstroke at the 2016 European Championships and won medals in the 50 m and 100 m, qualifying for the 2016 Summer Olympics in these two events; he placed sixth in the 200 m.

Tarasevich was born in a family of swimming coaches and took up swimming aged six. He trains and studies engineering at the University of Louisville.

References

1995 births
Living people
Olympic swimmers of Russia
Swimmers at the 2016 Summer Olympics
Male backstroke swimmers
Russian male swimmers
Medalists at the FINA World Swimming Championships (25 m)
World Aquatics Championships medalists in swimming
Sportspeople from Omsk
European Aquatics Championships medalists in swimming
Universiade medalists in swimming
Universiade gold medalists for Russia
Universiade silver medalists for Russia
Universiade bronze medalists for Russia
Medalists at the 2019 Summer Universiade
Swimmers at the 2020 Summer Olympics